Sylvia Olayinka Walmina Oreshola Blyden (born 1 October 1971 in Freetown, Sierra Leone) is a Sierra Leonean journalist, political commentator, newspaper publisher, and former Sierra Leone minister of Social Welfare, Gender and Children Affairs under erstwhile President Ernest Bai-Koroma from 2016 to 2017. She served as Special Executive Assistant to Sierra Leone's former president Ernest Bai Koroma from 2013 to 2015.

Blyden is the founder, CEO, and publisher of Sierra Leonean newspaper Awerness Times. She is the only female news publisher in Sierra Leone, and "one of the most recognisable names in the country." She has spoken of her interest to eventually run for the presidency of Sierra Leone.

Born and raised in the capital Freetown, into a prominent political family, Blyden is widely considered one of the most powerful and highly influential female political figures in Sierra Leone. She was a close ally of Sierra Leone's former president Ernest Bai Koroma, and a prominent supporter and public defender of Koroma's presidency. But sadly despicable, former president Ernest Bai-Koroma and his ventriloquist puppets in the APC continue to show ingratitude to her for all that she did to publicly defend the legacy of former President Koroma.

Blyden is a Christian and a member of the Creole ethnic group. Blyden is the great-great-granddaughter of Edward Wilmot Blyden, the "father of Pan-Africanism". Her maternal grandfather is a Sierra Leonean politician Solomon A. J. Pratt, and her paternal grandfather is the late Sierra Leonean diplomat Edward Wilmot Blyden III.

Political Advocacy.

Dr. Sylvia Olayinka Blyden was on 1 May 2020, arrested by the paramilitary dictatorship of current president Julius Maada Bio of Sierra Leone's People Party and charged for seditious libel for untiring advocacy in exposing the excesses of the government that have subjected Sierra Leoneans to unbearable cost of living. She was arrested and placed behind bars for 21 days without any charges – violating her constitutional rights. After 21 days in jail, the government of retired brigadier general and former junta leader, Julius Maada Bio, brought down trumped-up and cooked charges against newspaper publisher and social justice bulwark, Dr. Sylvia Olayinka Blyden. Whilst at the court, she was refused a bill through the influence of President Bio and his SLPP which caused a total of 51 days behind rusty bars. After six months of hearing into the case in court, the cooked charges against Dr. Blyden was thrown out of court on 18 November 2020, because of no proof to justify the government's flimsy charges against her.

After the election that brought President Bio to the helm of power, she was one of the few who challenged the results of the election by filing a petition before the high court of Sierra Leone praying the court to nullify the election of President Bio for the re-conduct of fresh election as the 2018 March election was fraudulent. After two years and a half since her petition was filed, the court finally started a hearing into her case in January 2021. During the hearing into the case in the hallowed chambers of the Supreme Court, Dr. Blyden, as the first respondent, represented herself without a lawyer and profoundly and eloquently presented her arguments on why the high court should nullify the election that brought Julius Maada Bio to the nation's presidency. During such presentation, lawyers and non-lawyers in the chambers of the high court nulled their heads in thunderous applause and thrill by the eloquent display of extreme brilliance by Dr. Sylvia Olayinka Blyden in the hallowed chambers of Sierra Leone's high court. But after months of deliberations from both parties, the high court could not grant the request of Dr. Blyden to invalidate the election of President Bio.

Biography
Sylvia Olayinka Walmina Oreshola Blyden was born on 1 October 1971 in Freetown, Sierra Leone to Creole parents. She entered the Annie Walsh School with the best Selective Entrance results of entrants in 1982 and left with the best GCE O'Levels for the school in 1987; she was to graduate with the best BSc results from Medical School in 1993 and again graduate with proficiency in 1996 with an M.D in Medicine during which period she emerged as Sierra Leone's first woman to be elected as University students' leader in 1994.

Blyden is the great-great-granddaughter of Edward Wilmot Blyden, the "father of Pan-Africanism". Her maternal grandfather was the Sierra Leonean politician Solomon A. J. Pratt, and her paternal grandfather was the late Sierra Leonean diplomat Edward Wilmot Blyden III.

Career
A Child-Appointed International Goodwill Ambassador for Sierra Leone's Children, Sylvia Blyden has been a Youths and Women's Rights Activist. She represented Sierra Leone's Female Youths in Beijing during the 1995 United Nations Women's Confab, and was chosen by her African peers to deliver the Female Youths of Africa Speech on 11 August 1995.

In early 2002, she became Sierra Leone's youngest National Political Party Leader at the age of 30, and the third Sierra Leone woman to lead a fully registered political party (the first being Presidential Candidate, the late Mrs. Jeridine Williams-Sarho in 1996).

Founded own newspaper
Following her 24-Hours Internet Cafes, she launched a news media in 2005 known as Awareness Times, which is generally considered critical of the excesses of Government and State Institutions including the President, Ernest Bai Koroma.

Awards and honours
Blyden remains the youngest ever Sierra Leonean to be nationally honoured with an Officer of the Rokel insignia in recognition of her meritorious service to the Nation, on 27 April 2007 Independence Day.

References

External links
 Exclusive Press website
 Panafrican Press website
 Awareness Times website
 Children's Agenda International website
 Sierra Leone Web
 AllAfrica.Com

Living people
Sierra Leone Creole people
Sierra Leonean people of African-American descent
Sierra Leonean people of Caribbean descent
People from Freetown
Newspaper publishers (people)
1971 births
People educated in Freetown, Sierra Leone